Jovana Zlatičanin (born 3 April 1990) is a Montenegrin footballer who plays as a defender. She has been a member of the Montenegro women's national team.

References

1990 births
Living people
Women's association football defenders
Montenegrin women's footballers
Montenegro women's international footballers
KFF Vllaznia Shkodër players